Archila is a surname. Notable people with the surname include:

Ana Maria Archila (born 1978/1979), Colombian-born US activist
Andrés Archila (1913–2002), Guatemalan violinist and orchestra conductor
William Archila (born 1968), Salvadoran poet and writer

See also
Arcila (surname)
Arcilla

Spanish-language surnames